Europop refers to a style of pop music that originated in Europe and is generally more dance and trance oriented than American pop. Europop includes Italo disco and later Eurodance. The Europop genre originated in the late 1970s and topped the charts throughout the 1980s and 1990s.

List of Europop artists
 ABBA
 Ace of Base
 Army of Lovers
 Modern Talking
 Mónica Naranjo
 Nek
 Robyn
 Roxette
 S.O.A.P.
 A Touch of Class (ATC)

References

 
Europop